Hussain Dalal is an Indian actor and writer who is known for Brahmāstra: Part One – Shiva (2022), Yeh Jawaani Hai Deewani (2013), 2 States (2014), Kalank (2019), Dhindora (2021), Toofaan (2021), Bring On the Night (2012) and Margarita with a Straw (2014). In September 2017, he appeared as one of the three mentors along with Zakir Khan and Mallika Dua for the fifth season of The Great Indian Laughter Challenge which is judged by actor Akshay Kumar.

Filmography

Awards
 Best Dialogue at Producers Guild Film Awards for Yeh Jawaani Hai Deewani
Best Actor in Short Film for Shameless (2018) at Filmfare Awards

References

External links
 

Living people
21st-century Indian male actors
Indian male screenwriters
Indian male film actors
Hindi screenwriters
Male actors in Hindi cinema
Year of birth missing (living people)